The Zhu Gaoxu rebellion, also known as the Dingnan Incident (定難之變), was a rebellion by Zhu Gaoxu, the Prince of Han, second son of the Yongle Emperor against his nephew, the Xuande Emperor, grandson of the Yongle Emperor through his first son, the Hongxi Emperor. The rebellion ultimately failed.

Timeline
May 1425: Zhu Gaochi, the Hongxi Emperor, dies
June 1425: Zhu Gaoxu sets up ambush for the Xuande Emperor in Nanjing

References

Rebellions in the Ming dynasty
Wars of succession involving the states and peoples of Asia